The men's tournament in ice hockey at the 2010 Winter Olympics was held in Vancouver, British Columbia, Canada, from February 16–28, 2010. Games were hosted at two venues – Canada Hockey Place (renamed from "General Motors Place" for the Olympics due to IOC rules disallowing host venues to be named after non-Olympic sponsors) and UBC Thunderbird Arena. These Olympics were the first to take place in a city with an National Hockey League team since the NHL players were introduced in 1998, which meant players on the Vancouver Canucks who were competing in the Olympics were playing in their home arena: Roberto Luongo for Canada, Ryan Kesler for the United States, Pavol Demitra for Slovakia, Sami Salo for Finland, Christian Ehrhoff for Germany, and Daniel and Henrik Sedin for Sweden.

Teams from twelve national hockey associations competed, seeded into three groups for the preliminary round. The tournament consisted of 30 games: 18 in the preliminary round (teams played the other teams in their own group); 4 qualification playoff games; 4 quarterfinal games; 2 semifinal games; 1 bronze medal game; and 1 gold medal game.

During the tournament, Teemu Selänne of Finland became the all-time leader for points scored in the Olympics. He notched an assist in his second game of the tournament for 37 career points, surpassing Valeri Kharlamov of the Soviet Union, Vlastimil Bubník of Czechoslovakia, and Harry Watson of Canada. Sweden's goaltender Henrik Lundqvist set a modern-day Olympic shutout streak record of 172 minutes and 34 seconds, continuous from the final of the gold medal game of the 2006 Olympics until Sweden's quarterfinal against Slovakia.

The tournament was won by Canada for the record eighth time (one more than the Soviet Union), which defeated the United States in overtime in the gold medal game. Canada's loss to the U.S. in the preliminary round of the tournament remains, as of the conclusion of the 2016 World Cup of Hockey, their most recent defeat in non-exhibition best-on-best international men's play.

Qualification

Belarus, Canada, Czech Republic, Finland, Russia, Slovakia, Sweden, Switzerland and the United States qualified as the top nine teams in the IIHF World Ranking. Germany, Latvia and Norway qualified via the qualification tournament for teams ranked 10th through 30th.

Rosters

Preliminary round
Points to each team were awarded as follows:
3 points for a win at the conclusion of regulation time
2 points for an overtime or shootout win
1 point for an overtime or shootout loss
0 points for a loss at the conclusion of regulation

If two or more teams were tied in points, the following tiebreaker criteria were used:
 points earned in games involving only tied teams
 goal difference in games involving only tied teams
 goals scored in games involving only tied teams
 goal difference in all group games
 goals scored in all group games
 better 2009 IIHF World Ranking position

If a criterion left only two teams tied, then those teams were ranked based on their head-to-head result.

Group A

All times are local (UTC−8).

Group B

All times are local (UTC−8).

Group C

All times are local (UTC−8).

Ranking after preliminary round

Playoff round
Following the completion of the preliminary round, all teams were ranked 1D through 12D. To determine this ranking, the following criteria were used in the order presented:

higher position in the group
higher number of points
better goal difference
higher number of goals scored for
better 2009 IIHF World Ranking.

Bracket

 † Indicates overtime victory
 ‡ Indicates shootout victory

Qualification playoffs
The top four ranked teams (1D–4D) received byes to and were deemed the home team in the quarterfinals as they were seeded to advance, with the remaining eight teams (5D–12D) playing qualification playoff games as follows:

  vs.  (winner re-ranked as E1)
  vs.  (winner re-ranked as E2)
  vs.  (winner re-ranked as E3)
  vs.  (winner re-ranked as E4).

If the score remained even after regulation, a 10-minute overtime period was played. If neither team scored, a shoot out of three rounds of penalty shots decided the winner. The four winners of these qualification playoff games advanced to the quarterfinal round, while the losers of the qualification playoff games received a final ranking of 9 through 12 based on their preliminary round ranking.

All times are local (UTC−8)

Quarterfinals
Teams seeded D1 to D4 were the home teams. If the teams were tied after 60 minutes of regulation, a 10-minute overtime period decided the winner immediately upon the next goal. If the game remained tied after the overtime period, a penalty shot competition determined the winning team.

Following the quarterfinal games, the winning teams were re-ranked F1 through F4, with the winner of 1D vs. E4 re-ranked as F1, the winner of 2D vs. E3 re-ranked as F2, the winner of 3D vs. E2 re-ranked as F3, and the winner of 4D vs. E1 re-ranked as F4. The losers of the quarterfinal round games received a final ranking of 5 through 8 based on their preliminary round ranking.

All times are local (UTC−8).

Semifinals
All times are local (UTC−8).

Bronze medal game

All times are local (UTC−8).

Gold medal game
All times are local (UTC−8).

The gold medal game was a rematch of the men's tournament in ice hockey at the 2002 Winter Olympics held in Salt Lake City, United States. In addition, Chris Pronger, Scott Niedermayer, Martin Brodeur and Jarome Iginla of Team Canada were returnees from the 2002 gold-winning squad and collected their second gold medal. Brian Rafalski and Chris Drury were the only players remaining from USA's 2002 silver squad.

The final score was a 3–2 win for Team Canada. Goal scorers for Canada were Jonathan Toews, Corey Perry and Sidney Crosby, with the winning goal scored in overtime. For USA, the goal scorers were Ryan Kesler and Zach Parise, the latter tying the game with 25 seconds left, forcing it to go into sudden death.

Sidney Crosby scored the game-winning goal off a pass from Jarome Iginla, seven minutes and forty seconds into overtime for Canada, gaining victory over the United States. The puck has been sent to the Hockey Hall of Fame in Toronto; in Canadian media, Crosby's goal has been compared in significance to the ones scored by Paul Henderson in the 1972 Summit Series and Mario Lemieux in the 1987 Canada Cup.

The referees for the final were Bill McCreary (Canada) and Dan O'Halloran (Canada), while the linesmen were Stefan Fonselius (Finland) and Jean Morin (Canada).

The gold medal game was the last competitive event at the Olympics before the closing ceremony.

Game summary

Television ratings

The gold medal game drew a big hockey audience in both Canada and the United States.

In Canada, the game drew an average 16.6 million viewers while 26.5 million Canadians watched at least part of the game. Canada's Olympic Broadcast Media Consortium claims that 22 million people – or two thirds of the Canadian population – were watching the gold medal game when Sidney Crosby scored in overtime, making the game the most-watched television broadcast in Canadian history. However, a new ratings system intended to better track out-of-home viewership was only implemented in August 2009, making it difficult to accurately compare these results with ratings prior to that date – specifically, the 2002 Canada–USA gold medal game in Salt Lake City, the record holder under the previous system. There was some speculation that the final game of the 1972 Summit Series had as many as 18 million viewers, although recently recovered Nielsen ratings archives indicate that only 4.255 million Canadians watched that game live.

In the United States, NBC said that the game was the most-watched hockey game in the U.S. in 30 years, drawing 27.6 million, the largest since the United States–Finland game that decided the gold medal at the 1980 Winter Olympics.

Final rankings
The final standings of the tournament according to the IIHF:

Statistics

Average age
Team Finland was the oldest team in the tournament, averaging 31 years and 5 months. Team USA was the youngest team in the tournament, averaging 27 years and 2 months. Gold medalists team Canada averaged 28 years and 2 months. Tournament average was 29 years.

Leading scorers
Rankings based upon points.

Leading goaltenders
Goalkeepers with 40% or more of their team's total minutes.

Shutout posters

  (2)

Awards
United States' Ryan Miller was named the most valuable player and received the Directorate Award for best goaltender of the tournament. Directorate Awards also went to Brian Rafalski (United States) for best defenceman, and to Jonathan Toews (Canada) for best forward.

The tournament all-star team was voted on by the international media at the conclusion of the event. The following players were named:

Toews, along with Brent Seabrook and Duncan Keith would become the fourth, fifth and sixth players to win both Olympic gold medal and Stanley Cup (with the Chicago Blackhawks) in the same year, following Ken Morrow 1980, and Steve Yzerman and Brendan Shanahan (2002). Patrick Kane would become the fourth player to win both Olympic silver medal and Stanley Cup in the same year, following Red Wings Sergei Fedorov in 1998, and Chris Chelios and Brett Hull in 2002.

Triple Gold Club

The Triple Gold Club, made up of individuals who have won the Stanley Cup plus gold medals at the Olympics and World Championships, gained two new members:
 Team Canada centre Eric Staal became the 23rd player to win all three competitions. He had previously won the Stanley Cup in 2006 with the Carolina Hurricanes and the World Championships in 2007.
 Team Canada head coach Mike Babcock became the first coach in the Triple Gold Club. He had led Team Canada to World Championships gold in 2004 and the Detroit Red Wings to the Stanley Cup in 2008.

Later the same season, Team Canada centre Jonathan Toews would go on to become the 24th and youngest player in the Triple Gold Club, following up his Olympic gold medal with the Stanley Cup with the Chicago Blackhawks just four months after winning Olympic gold. He had previously won the World Championships in 2007.

Officials
Games were primarily officiated by NHL referees, a stipulation by the NHL if most Olympic players are NHLers, according to the IIHF (not NHL) rules.

References

External links
Game schedule (official IIHF web site)
Vancouver 2010 Hockey 
2010 Winter Olympics – Men's tournament at ESPN

 
Men's tournament